Patron de New-York is a novel by Ivorian author Bernard Dadié. It won the Grand prix littéraire d'Afrique noire in 1965.

Ivorian novels
1964 novels
French-language novels
Grand prix littéraire d'Afrique noire winners